is a Japanese football who plays as a midfielder for J2 League club Blaublitz Akita.In 2022 he suffered an injury in the 2nd game and was out all season.

Club statistics
Updated to 2 December 2022.

Honours
 Blaublitz Akita
 J3 League (1): 2020

References

External links

Profile at Cerezo Osaka

1996 births
Living people
Association football people from Nagasaki Prefecture
Japanese footballers
J1 League players
J2 League players
J3 League players
Cerezo Osaka players
Cerezo Osaka U-23 players
Blaublitz Akita players
Association football defenders